In military terms, 132nd Division may refer to:

 Infantry Divisions
132nd Infantry Division (Wehrmacht)
132nd Division (Imperial Japanese Army)
132nd Rifle Division (Soviet Union)

 Armoured Divisions
Italian 132nd Armored Division Ariete